Martin Reisslein is an engineer from Arizona State University in Tempe. He was named a Fellow of the Institute of Electrical and Electronics Engineers (IEEE) in 2014 for his contributions to the design and performance evaluation of metropolitan networks and multimedia networking mechanisms. He holds B.S. (1994) from Darmstadt University of Applied Sciences and an M.S. (1996) and Ph.D. (1998) from the University of Pennsylvania.

References

External links

Living people
University of Pennsylvania alumni
Arizona State University faculty
Fellow Members of the IEEE
Year of birth missing (living people)
Place of birth missing (living people)
American electrical engineers